Emma Wu Ying-chieh (born 11 August 1989), also known as Gui Gui, is a Taiwanese singer and actress.

Early life
Wu Ying-chieh, nicknamed Gui Gui, was born in Keelung City, Taiwan on 11 August 1989, and is the only child of divorced parents. In her early childhood, the family moved frequently, and this resulted in her having to attend five different elementary schools. Wu briefly attended the Dao Jiang Senior High School of Nursing & Home Economics (臺北市私立稻江高級護理家事職業學校) before transferring to Zhuangjing Senior Vocational School in the Xindian District of Taipei, where she became classmates with JPM's Wang Zi.

Regarding the origin of her alias, Gui Gui (literally: Ghost), Wu has explained that she is "full of reckless things"  and adopted a phonological pun on the Chinese idiom to describe herself as having an eccentric or impish personality.

Career

2005–2009: Variety and musical debut
In November 2005, Wu debuted as one of the original members of Blackie's Teenage Club, a variety show seeking talents for the television network, Channel [V]. After three rounds of casting, Wu was recruited to join Hei Se Hui Mei Mei, a nine-member Taiwanese girl group established c. 2006. Though the group's name was a clever play on the words "Hei She Hui" and "Mei Mei", it was renamed Hey Girl after a label change and the launch of their first self-titled album in August 2008.

In April 2009, Channel V's director, Andy Chang, responded to rumors of Wu leaving his agency. He expressed that though she was unlikely to renew her contract, the singer would partake in group activities per usual since Hey Girl'''s record contract did not belong to Channel V. Yet, despite Chang's statement, Wu was notably absent from their album promotions, and on 6 May 2009, he confirmed her departure from both Hey Girl and Channel V's management.

2007–2015: Transition into acting 
In 2007, Wu announced her acting debut with the idol drama, Brown Sugar Macchiato. However, the drama was viewed more as an "introductory chapter" to the two groups, Hey Girl and Lollipop F, than a major production. After thirteen episodes, the series ended on 7 October 2007, and an official soundtrack was released with songs from Lollipop and Hey Girl.

In 2008, Wu starred in Mysterious Incredible Terminator, opposite of Aaron Yan from Fahrenheit and Alien Huang. After the completion of M.I.T., Wu and Aaron, both widely praised for their on-screen chemistry and closeness, were to co-star in Taiwanese drama Momo Love. Yet, filming was halted due to Yan's scheduling conflicts, and once resumed, Wu and Aaron were replaced by Cyndi Wang and Jiro Wang, respectively.

Following a two-year hiatus, Wu signed with Polyface Entertainment Media Group in 2011 and returned to the small screen with I, My Brother (我和我的兄弟·恩). Later that year, Wu was cast in the television version of Painted Skin (TV series), in collaboration with Fiona Sit, Chen Yi Rong, and Li Zhong Han. It was also this opportunity that allowed Wu to shift her focus to the Chinese market.

In 2012, Wu debuted on the big screen with a three part-film series, The Four, starring Ronald Cheng, Anthony Wong, Deng Chao, and Liu Yifei. In February 2013, she was cast in the Korean reality show, We Got Married with Ok Taecyeon, of South Korean boy band 2PM, as her virtual husband. Regarding this experience, she has commented, "I feel thankful that you found me. I think the fact that I was able to do this show was a gift from the up above."

In the consecutive years, Wu has starred in Chinese TV dramas: Legend of Lu Zhen, Incisive Great Teacher (犀利仁師), A Different Kind of Pretty Man (不一樣的美男子), Roommate Diaries  (一男三女合租記), The Four (2015 TV series), The Girl Wearing Tassel Earrings (戴流蘇耳環的少女) and The Legend of the Flying Daggers (飛刀又見飛刀 (2016年電視劇)).

2016–present: Musical comeback
On 7 March 2016, Wu signed with CJ E&M and returned to the music scene. In preparation for her Korean debut, she underwent a rigorous 3-month training that included vocal, choreography and Korean lessons. On 26 September, Wu released her first official music video, Sugar Rush, and on 7 October, she launched her first self-titled EP, GEMMA. Introducing the extended play, Wu stated that GEMMA represented a new identity. "G" was derived from her nickname, Ghost, while Emma is her proclaimed English name.

In June 2017, Wu parted ways with CJ E&M, and established her personal agency Gemma Wu Studio. In October of the same year, she released the single "Knock Knock Knock" after investing NT$8 million in production works herself.

In August 2019, Wu joined Avex Taiwan and released the single "Love Me Love Me" in celebration of her thirtieth birthday. On 22 September 2020, she released her first studio album GX'' to commemorate her 15th debut anniversary.

Filmography

Television series

Film

Variety shows

Theatre

Music video appearances

Discography

Studio album

Extended plays

Singles

Collaborations

Soundtrack appearances

Awards and nominations

References

External links 

 
 
  
 

1989 births
Living people
Taiwanese television actresses
Taiwanese film actresses
21st-century Taiwanese actresses
Musicians from Keelung
Taiwanese idols
21st-century Taiwanese singers
21st-century Taiwanese women singers
Actresses from Keelung